Christian Heinrich Tramm (8 May 1819, Hamburg – 3 September 1861, Hanover) was a German architect who, in 1850, introduced the Rundbogenstil in Hanover.

Biography 
After studying at the Technical University of Hanover from 1835 to 1838, he continued his studies with Friedrich von Gärtner in Munich until 1840, then returned to Hanover to work with Georg Ludwig Friedrich Laves. The stables in the Georgengarten (1844) were his first independent project.

For many years, he was construction manager at the Court Theater (now the Staatsoper Hannover). Around 1850, he began using his familiar round-arch style (Rundbogenstil).

In 1855 he was appointed Court Architect; the youngest person to hold that position. That same year, he had his portrait painted by the Court Painter, Friedrich Kaulbach and, in return, designed a home and studio for him: the "" on Waterloostraße.

At the time of Tramm's death in 1861, the Welfenschloss was still incomplete. It was finished by his cousin, .

Tramm and his wife, Emma, both died in 1861, possibly from tuberculosis. Their son, was only seven at the time. In 1891, he would become the City Manager.

References

Further reading 
 Klaus Mlynek, Waldemar R. Röhrbein (Eds.): Stadtlexikon Hannover: Von den Anfängen bis zur Gegenwart. Schlütersche Verlagsgesellschaft, 2009, .
 Helmut Knocke in: Dirk Böttcher, Klaus Mlynek, Waldemar R. Röhrbein, Hugo Thielen: Hannoversches Biographisches Lexikon. Von den Anfängen bis in die Gegenwart, Schlütersche, 2002, .
 Herbert Obenaus: "Brühlstraße 27: Die Villa Simon". In: Die Universität Hannover. Ihre Bauten, ihre Gärten, ihre Planungsgeschichte, Universität Hannover, 2003, pp.239–246.
 Helio Adão Greven: "Leben und Werke des Hofbaumeisters Christian Heinrich Tramm (1819–1861)". Special edition of the Hannoversche Geschichtsblätter, Vol.23 #3/4, Dissertation, Fakultät für Bauwesen, 1969, pp.145–268

External links 

 Reinhard Glaß: Data on Tramm @ Architekten und Künstler mit direktem Bezug zu Conrad Wilhelm Hase
 Entry on the Joseph Berliner-Haus (formerly the Villa Simon), Brühlstraße 27 @ Stadthistorie Hannover

19th-century German architects
University of Hanover alumni
Architects from Hamburg
1819 births
1861 deaths
19th-century deaths from tuberculosis
Tuberculosis deaths in Germany